The Inflexible was a 90-gun Suffren-class Ship of the line of the French Navy

Career 
Commissioned in Rochefort in 1840, Inflexible was appointed to the Mediterranean squadron, where she served from 1841 under Captain Guérin des Essarts.

From 1860, she was used as a boys' school in Brest, and was eventually broken up in 1875.

Notes, citations, and references

Notes

Citations

References

 90-guns ships-of-the-line

Ships of the line of the French Navy
Ships built in France
1839 ships
Suffren-class ships of the line
Crimean War naval ships of France